Giribala Mohanty was an Indian aviator. She was the first female aviator from Odisha, and the first to have a license to fly a private aircraft. She was invited to join the other female aviators in 1967 Convention organized by the Ninety-Nine Inc., the International Women Pilots Association at Washington, D.C. There she joined the other female aviators in a conducted flying tour of the United States.

References 

Indian women aviators
Indian aviators
Women from Odisha